Nzorbang is a small town in Moyen-Ogooué Province, in northwestern Gabon. It lies across the  Ogooue River about 8 kilometres north of Lambaréné, just south of Adané.

The  N1 road runs in the area. Nzorbang is biologically rich lying on the river and has been subject to several biological studies. In 1906 a study revealed  Chromidotillapia in the area. Teleostei and Microsynodontis have also been observed in the river.

References
www.univie.ac.at

Populated places in Moyen-Ogooué Province